The 1994 Volta a Catalunya was the 74th edition of the Volta a Catalunya cycle race and was held from 8 September to 14 September 1994. The race started in L'Hospitalet and finished in Sant Feliu de Guíxols. The race was won by Claudio Chiappucci of the Carrera team.

General classification

Notes

References

1994
Volta
1994 in Spanish road cycling
September 1994 sports events in Europe